The first Battle of St-Dizier was fought on January 26, 1814, and resulted the victory of French under Napoleon Bonaparte against Russians under General Lanskoy. Napoleon and his troops had left Ligny the day before; Lanskoy held St-Dizier with 800 dragoons, and he left the town to join Blücher.

The second battle occurred on March 26, 1814 and resulted the victory of French under Napoleon Bonaparte against Russians under General Ferdinand Wintzingerode. This was Napoleon's penultimate victory. Coming up on the right bank of the Aube, Napoleon was informed by MacDonald that a large part of the Allied army was advancing on his rear guard. Napoleon chose to present his whole army for battle at St Dizier, but MacDonald's information was incorrect; Napoleon found only a body of cavalry under the command of General Wintzingerode, whom Napoleon's troops quickly put to flight.

References

Further reading
Lamartine, Alphonse de (1872). The History of the Restoration of the Monarchy in France. Captain Rafter, translator. London: Bell and Daldy.
Gneisenau, August (1815). The Life and Campaigns of Field-marshal Prince Blücher of Wahlstatt. J. E. Marston, translator. London: Sherwood.
Lockhart, J. G. (1830). The History of Napoleon Buonaparte. New York: Harpers.
Talleyrand, Charled Maurice (1891). Memoirs of the Prince de Talleyrand. Raphael de Beaufort, trans. Five volumes. New York: Putnam.

External links
Gazetteer Entry

1814 in France
Battles of the Napoleonic Wars
Battles involving Russia
January 1814 events